Leucauge is a spider genus of long-jawed orb weavers, with over 160 species and fully pantropical distribution.

The genus was first documented in Scottish zoologist Adam White's 1841 Description of new or little known Arachnida. Charles Darwin had suggested the name of the genus and collected the first specimen in May 1832, later named L. argyrobapta. 

A vague description and the loss of the only specimen left the genus ill-defined.  Leucauge developed into something of a wastebasket taxon containing 300 loosely related species, until research in the year 2010 resolved L. argyrobapta as a synonym of the quite common L. venusta and allowed revision and reclassing of the genus. However, a 2018 paper restored Leucauge argyrobapta as a separate species.

The body and leg shapes and the silver, black and yellow markings of Leucauge females make identification of the genus relatively easy. They have two rows of long, slender curved hairs on the femurs of the fourth leg. In most cases the web is slanted rather than vertical and the spider rests in the middle of the web with its underside facing upwards.

Selected species

The World Spider Catalog accepted 167 species in the genus . This number includes:
 Leucauge argyra
 Leucauge argyrobapta
 Leucauge celebesiana
 Leucauge decorata
 Leucauge digna (worthy orb-weaver) – Saint Helena
 Leucauge dromedaria (silver orb-weaver, horizontal orb-weaver)
 Leucauge mabelae
 Leucauge mariana
 Leucauge subblanda
 Leucauge subgemmea
 Leucauge tessellata
 Leucauge undulata
 Leucauge venusta (orchard spider, orchard orb-weaver)

Name
Greek λευκός (leukos) means "white", while αὐγή (augḗ) means "dawn," so called because Leucauge spiders build their first web before dawn.

Gallery

References

Further reading
 "Riparian insects and the diet of the riparian spider Leucauge celebisiana (Araneae: Tetragnathidae)".  PDF

External links

 Picture of L. dromedaria
 Pictures of L. mabelae
 Leucauge decorata description and picture
 Picture of Leucauge sp., about to be eaten by Anolis carolinensis

 
Araneomorphae genera
Pantropical spiders